Osgoldcross Rural District was a rural district in the West Riding of Yorkshire, England. It was created in 1938, from 19 remaining parishes of the disbanded Pontefract Rural District after three-quarters of its population (but only a small fraction of the area) had been transferred to surrounding authorities - specifically to Castleford (which took 14,145 of the 23,981 in the district in 1931), Knottingley, and Pontefract.

It was named after the Wapentake of Osgoldcross and administered from Pontefract.

Since 1 April 1974, it has formed part of the District of Selby and the City of Wakefield.

At the time of its dissolution it consisted of the following 19 civil parishes.

Darrington and East Hardwick went to the City of Wakefield in West Yorkshire.  The other 17 parishes went to Selby district in North Yorkshire.

See also
Osgoldcross (UK Parliament constituency)

References
http://www.visionofbritain.org.uk/relationships.jsp?u_id=10074319&c_id=10001043

Rural districts of the West Riding of Yorkshire
Districts of England abolished by the Local Government Act 1972
Local government in Wakefield